The Armed Forces Act 1972 [Act 77) ( [Akta 77]), is a Malaysian laws which enacted to amend and consolidate the law relating to the establishment, government and discipline of the armed forces of Malaysia.

Structure
The Armed Forces Act 1972, in its current form (15 June 2016), consists of 10 Parts containing 217 sections and 2 schedules (including 6 amendments).
 Part I: Preliminary
 Part II: The Regular Forces of Malaysia 
 Part III: Commissioning and Appointment of Officers of the Regular Forces
 Part IV: Enlistment and Terms of Service for the Regular Forces
 Part V: Service Offences and Punishments
 Offences in Respect of Military Service
 Mutiny and Insubordination
 Avoidance of or Failure to Perform Military Duties
 Offences Relating to Property
 Offences Relating to, and by, Persons in Custody
 Navigation and Flying Offences
 Offences Relating to Service Tribunals
 Miscellaneous Offences
 Punishments
 Arrest
 Summary Disposal of Charges
 Courts-Martial: General Provisions
 Courts-Martial--Provision relating to trial
 Procedure
 Confirmation, Revision and Review of Proceedings of Courts-Martial
 Review of Summary Findings and Awards
 Findings of Insanity
 Savings for Functions of Judge Advocate General
 Commencement, Suspension and Duration of Sentences
 Execution of Sentences of Death, Imprisonment and Detention
 Trial of Persons Ceasing to be Subject to Service Law and Time Limits for Trials
 Relations between Service Law and Civil Courts and Finality of Trials
 Inquiries
 Miscellaneous Provisions
 Interpretation
 Part VI: Pay, Forfeitures and Deductions
 Part VII: General Provisions
 Powers of Command
 Redress of Complaints
 Provisions as to Ships under Convoy
 Provisions as to Salvage
 Provisions relating to Deserters and Absentees without Leave
 Offences relating to the Armed Forces punishable by Civil Courts
 Provisions as to Evidence
 Miscellaneous Provisions
 Part VIII: The Regular Forces Reserve
 Part IX: The Volunteer Forces of Malaysia
 Part X: Application of the Act and Supplemental Provisions
 Persons subject to Service Law under this Act
 Application of the Act to Particular Forces
 Schedules

See also
 Armed Forces Act

References

External links
 Armed Forces Act 1972 [Act 77] 

1972 in Malaysian law
Malaysian federal legislation